Housing Finance Group of Kenya (HFGK), also Housing Finance Group Limited (HFGL), is a financial services holding company based in Kenya. HFGK maintains its headquarters in Nairobi, the capital and largest city, with subsidiaries and branches in major urban centers in the country.

Location
The company headquarters are located in Rehani House, long Koinange Street, at the corner with Kenyatta Avenue, in Nairobi, Kenya's capital and largest city. The geographical coordinates of the company headquarters are:01°17'06.4"S, 36°49'10.0"E (Latitude:-1.285111; Longitude:36.819444).

Overview
Housing Finance Group of Kenya, is a non-operating financial services holding company, established in 2015 to comply with the country's banking laws. The changes are also in anticipation of expanding operations outside Kenya. HFGK maintains the following subsidiaries: (1) Housing Finance Company Limited (HFC Limited), is a mortgage and retail bank. (2) Housing Finance Development and Investment Limited (HFDI), is a property development and real-estate investment company. (3) Housing Finance Insurance Agency (HFIA), an insurance services company. and (4) Housing Finance Foundation (HFF), an investment company specializing in installment purchase and lease finance for businesses and individuals.

As of December 2016, the Group's total assets were valued at KES:71.93 billion (US$705.11 million), with shareholders' equity of KES:11.29 billion (US$110.67 million)

Ownership
, the major shareholders in the stock of the  holding company were as listed in the table below:

* Britam Holdings Limited's direct and indirect shareholding in Housing Finance 48.53%.

See also
 Equity Group Holdings Limited
 KCB Group Limited

References

External links
Website of Housing Finance Group of Kenya

Housing finance companies of Kenya
Companies based in Nairobi 
Holding companies of Kenya
Financial services companies established in 2015
Companies listed on the Nairobi Securities Exchange
Kenyan companies established in 2015
Holding companies established in 2015